The New Patriots is a 2020 Nigerian political drama film directed by Adebayo Tijani and Terry Ayebo. The film was produced by Rotimi Adelola, from a screenplay (in English) by Niji Akanni and translated to Yoruba by Prof. Mrs. Oluwayemisi Adebowale. The story was written by Rotimi Adelola, inspired by Patriots and Sinners, a novel written by Nnenna Ihebom. The script contributors include Tunde Kelani, Rotimi Adelola, Niji Akanni, Muritala Sule, film director Dami Taiwo and Jibola Soyele. The film received positive reviews from critics and was screened at several international film festivals

The film stars Akin Lewis, Lateef Adedimeji, Bimbo Oshin, Dele Odule and Taiwo Ibikunle. The film celebrates youth participation in the democratic process.

Cast 
 Akin Lewis as Dr. Nathaniel Olubo
 Lateef Adedimeji as Fred
 Bimbo Oshin as Princess Gladys Olubo
 Dele Odule as Chief Balogun
 Taiwo Ibikunle as Chief Yagaz
 Adebimpe Oyebade as Atilola Olubo
 Damipe Adekoya as Simisola Olubo
 Motilola Adekunle as Dr. Bibi Agba
 Jibola Soyele as Jibola
 Kemisola Isijola as Sewa
 Bimbo Sunday as Ahmed
 Adedeji Odundun as Alex

Reception 
A new social impact movie, The New Patriots, has been officially selected to be premiered in 3 countries in their respective film festivals:

 2020 Five Continents International Film Festival, Venezuela. It is the only feature film from Africa to be selected for that edition of the festival.
 2021 Montreal Independent Film Festival, Canada
 The African Film Festival (TAFF) 2021, US
 Toronto International Nollywood Film Festival (TINFF) 2021, Canada

The Film received an Honourable Mention at the 2021 Berlin Flash Film Festival, Germany.

Awards and nominations

References 

Films shot in Nigeria
2020 films
English-language Nigerian films
Films about corruption
2020s political thriller films
Yoruba-language films